Amanat, previously known as Nur Otan until 2022, is a political party in Kazakhstan. Being the largest to date, it has been the ruling party of the country from 1999, with a membership claiming to be of over 762,000 people in 2007. Amanat has been led by Erlan Qoşanov since 26 April 2022.

Under the 21-year leadership of former President Nursultan Nazarbayev since the party's founding, Amanat had constantly won Kazakhstan's presidential and national parliamentary elections, more often in recent history with a supermajority number of votes amidst claims of rigging and lack of viable opposition.

Originally founded on 12 February 1999 as simply Otan by former Prime Minister Sergey Tereshchenko, after the merger of several previously independent pro-presidential parties, including the People's Union of Kazakhstan Unity, the Liberal Movement of Kazakhstan, and the "For Kazakhstan — 2030" Movement. From there, the Otan eventually absorbed other parties such as the Democratic Party, People's Cooperative Party, Asar, and more recently the Civic and Agrarian parties in 2006 to become the biggest, gaining status of the party of power. That same year in December, the Otan was renamed to Nur Otan. In the 2007 legislative elections, the Nur Otan swept all the contested seats in the lower-house Mäjilis, leaving no other parties to have representation until 2012, though leaving its dominant-party control of the Parliament.

The Amanat has been viewed as a secular, conservative, catch-all party with an authoritarian form of governance that functions by its branches throughout the country and presence within nationwide institutional resources and maintains offices in all 16 of Kazakhstan’s administrative divisions, as well as 241 local offices which greatly contribute to the party's existence. The Amanat views itself as a party which promotes reforms in civil service, economic diversity, open government, the rule of law, and national interests.

History

Nazarbayev era (1999–2022)

1998–1999: Origins and foundation 
The Amanat traces back to its origins in October 1998, when a public association in support of President Nursultan Nazarbayev's re-election campaign bid in the 1999 election was formed, to which former Prime Minister Sergey Tereshchenko became the head of. The party derives its name from the Arabic words nūr (light) and vatan (fatherland), the latter of which is spelled as otan in the Kazakh language. At the meeting held on 19 January 1999, a decision was made to convert the campaign staff into a political party to which became registered on 12 February 1999.

In its 1st Founding Congress, held on 1 March 1999 in Almaty which was attended by about 400 delegates from all regions, cities and districts of the country. Amongst them were representatives of 17 nationalities, 104 entrepreneurs and businessmen, 67 public sector workers, 122 civil servants. The party outlined a program largely supportive of Nursultan Nazarbayev, who was elected by the delegates as the Otan chairman. However, Nazarbayev declined to take over the chairmanship on a constitutional basis, resulting in Tereshchenko taking the role as the acting chairman while Nazarbayev himself would serve as the de facto party leader. Speaking at the congress, the Nazarbayev stated that:"The country can relatively painlessly survive the modern world challenges, only strengthening the internal economy, internal political stability, only demonstrating civil consolidation and solidarity. And in this regard, I have special hopes for the political party being created today, which we decided to call the word 'Otan' (Fatherland). The main thing is that the party is created from below, at the initiative of those thousands of volunteers who supported my candidacy for the Presidency in all the settlements of our country."– President Nursultan Nazarbayev, speaking at the 1st Founding Congress, 1 March 1999

At the congress, several pro-presidential parties: the People's Union of Kazakhstan Unity, Liberal Movement of Kazakhstan, Democratic Party, and For Kazakhstan-2030 were merged with Otan.

On 23 April 1999, the party was re-registered in the Ministry of Justice.

1999–2006: Growth 
The Otan for the first time participated in the 1999 legislative elections, with 54 candidates from single-member districts and 18 from the party-list for the Mäjilis. The party won a minority of 23 out of 77 seats with 30.9% of the vote with a majority of independents and political associates whom were affiliated with the party's parliamentary group. On 14 December 1999, the Bureau of the Mäjilis registered the Otan parliamentary group with 39 MP's, which included 13 Senators, 26 Mäjilis members. By the decree of the party's Bureau of the Political Council, Quanyşbek Böltaev was approved as the head of the faction, and Urazalinov Sh.A. as the deputy. In the run-up to previous elections, Otan usually received a majority of domestic media coverage. Before the 1999 legislative elections, for example, it was reported that Otan was the main focus in almost 60% of the coverage. 

On 20 April 2001, at the 3rd Ordinary Congress, Nazarbayev summarised the results of the party's work telling that "the party has gained good work experience and over the past years has shown that it lives up to its name and can work to strengthen statehood, to consolidate society, to protect the interests of citizens."

At the 4th Extraordinary Congress held on 9 November 2002, the amendments and additions were made to the Otan's party charter, program for the development of small and medium-sized businesses for 2003–2005 was approved. Nazarbayev proclaimed three main themes of the congress agenda of which were: problems of political modernization, improvement of the political system–issues of further development of the economy and, accordingly, the solution of social programs–issues of security of the individual, society, the state. Nazarbayev proposed that the Otan should be a centrist party with social democratic platform to which he praised it as a "creative potential, advocating a state with a socially oriented market economy, with high social stability and a developed social infrastructure." From there, the People's Cooperative Party of Kazakhstan and Republican Political Party of Labour merged with Otan. By that time, the Otan had already 7,000 primary party organizations in all 206 district and city offices and 16 branches. 1,660 party members became members of regional, city and district mäslihats (local assemblies).

In 2003, 2,240 members of the Otan were elected to mäslihats (local assemblies) of all levels. Having an overwhelming majority in the representative bodies of power at all levels, the party gained its opportunity to influence the socio-economic policy of the state by region.

At the Otan's congress held on 15 June 2004, Nursultan Nazarbayev proclaimed that the "unity is the main condition for prosperity of our people and state." and with the Otan claiming that the party representatives made up only six percent of the total 1,755 candidates that were nominated for the 2004 legislative elections. In the 2004 Kazakh legislative election, the party won 60.6% of the popular vote and 42 out of 77 seats with 35 being from single-member districts, becoming a majority in the Mäjilis. Zharmakhan Tuyakbay, Chairman of the Mazhilis and a party loyalist renounced his Otan membership and resigned from post as the Mazhilis Chairman after criticising the government of rigging the elections in favour of the party. Tuyakbay eventually joined the opposition and would lead For a Just Kazakhstan alliance by running against Nazarbayev in the 2005 presidential election.

On 9 September 2005, the 8th Otan Extraordinary Congress was held with the participation of the party leader and head of state Nursultan Nazarbayev. For the first time, the delegates nominated Nazarbayev as a candidate for presidency. The party intended to unite all the constructive civic forces within the country on the platform of support for Nazarbayev and provide him with new opportunities to complete political reforms. The Otan pledged to implement the initiatives set by Nazarbayev of which were reviving the rural villages, developing agricultural production, domestic industry, small and medium-sized businesses. 
The Otan merged with Dariga Nazarbayeva's Asar on 4 July 2006, increasing the party's seats by 4 to 46 out of 77. After the merged party was formed, Nazarbayev remarked to his daughter "Tell your Asar members that... you are returning to your father." Dariga, on 19 June 2006, said that all pro-presidential parties should combine to create a grouping "with which no other party will be able to compete in the next 50 years."

In November 2006, it was announced that the Civic Party and the Agrarian Party would follow in Asar's path and also merge with Otan to increase the party's share of MP's from 46 to 57 seats out of 77. Nazarbayev said he expected other parties to merge with Otan. Nazarbayev said there should be fewer, stronger parties that "efficiently defend the interests of the population." At the subsequent party congress on 22 December 2006, delegates voted to rename Otan into the Nur Otan People's Democratic Party.

2006–2013: Rebranding and further developments 
On 4 July 2007, at the 11th Nur Otan Extraordinary Congress, Nazarbayev declared himself as sole leader of the party. This came after the dissolution of the 3rd Mazhilis in June 2007 and amendments to the Constitution of Kazakhstan, which removed limit on president's activities with political parties during his term of office. At the congress, Baqytjan Jumagulov became the First Deputy Chairman while Kairat Kelimbetov and Sergey Gromov were elected as deputy chairmen.  and the amendments to the Constitution which changed Kazakhstan's electoral system, the Nur Otan presented 127 persons in the party-list which were scheduled to be elected for the first time through proportional representation. In the August 2007 legislative elections, the Nur Otan won 88.1% of the vote and all the contested seats, making it the highest share for the party in history while other parties were unable pass the 7% electoral threshold, thus leaving the Nur Otan to have a sole party representation in the Parliament. This made the party become a central factor in the political decision-making process within the government, being compared to the Communist Party of the Soviet Union by the opposition.

In 2008, the Nur Otan formed its youth wing named Jas Otan and that same year in February, the party signed a cooperation agreement with the Agency of Combating Economic and Corruption Crime to which according to First Deputy Chairman Adilbek Zhaksybekov: "The public councils will influence through the media, through methods of public influence, so that cases brought for corruption offences are brought to an end." Just month later on 3 March 2008, the Nur Otan Republican Public Anti-Corruption Council was formed, which was an advisory body under the party aimed at fighting corruption.

At the Nur Otan Anti-Corruption Forum held on 6 November 2008, Nazarbayev proposed the creation of the Committee of Party Control which would provide public support and help the Nur Otan fight the corruption. He also called for the party to cooperate with non-government organisations (NGOs) and that the Nur Otan should keep issues of corruption in the health and justice system on the stand. That same day, changes took place within the party. Boran Raqymbekov was appointed as the chairman of the party's control committee, while new secretary posts were formed for the Nur Otan organisational and mass work with Sergey Gromov and Erlan Karin being appointed as the secretaries.

On 15 May 2009, the 12th Nur Otan Extraordinary Congress was held, from there Nazarbayev presented a plan for the nation to recover from the Great Recession and urged for the party members to develop Innovative development, raise the standard of living, and stability in society. He also called for a diversification within the economy, claiming that the agricultural sector would make great contributation to the cause. The congress also addressed the issues of improving the system of government, combating corruption and improving the efficiency of the party itself.

In May 2010, a Higher Party School was formed under the party, which aimed at improving the party's political studies.

At the 14th Extraordinary Congress held on 25 November 2011, the party unveiled its electoral platform called the "Kazakhstan 2017 Goals National Plan of Action". At the congress, Nazarbayev stated that "in the 21st century only strong states can develop successfully. As the political leadership party Nur Otan, it takes responsibility for the future of the country, the stability of society and the continuity of the political course in the coming decades." After the 2007 elections, the Nur Otan received backlash amongst opposition and international organisations. This eventually led to the Parliament, in which the Nur Otan had controlled, to pass an amendment that would guarantee for the opposing party to have a mandate in the Mazhilis whether it reaches the required 7% electoral threshold or not, with lawmakers from the Nur Otan itself whom called for a multi-party system. The Nur Otan at the 2012 legislative election swept 80.9% of the vote, winning a supermajority of 83 out of 98 seats, although suffering its worst loss of 15 seats in comparison to 2007. Two parties: the Ak Zhol Democratic Party and Communist People's Party of Kazakhstan gained its presence in the Parliament, although they were viewed as loyal to the government.

2013–2022: Political and economic reforms 

On 17–18 October 2013, at the 15th Nur Otan Extraordinary Congress in Astana of which was attended by 1,200 delegates representing all regional branches of the party and more than a 1,000 guests. The Nur Otan presented its doctrine to which called for evolutionary development and to build a democratic, prosperous, competitive and socially oriented state where every motivated, law-abiding and hard-working citizen would benefit himself and society. At the congress, a decision was made to adopt a new full name for the party as simply "Nur Otan", removing the "People's Democratic" wording in which First Deputy Chairman Bauyrjan Baibek argued that political parties do not put "ideological affiliation" in their name as basis for "international practice".

At the Nur Otan Political Council meeting on 11 November 2014, Nazarbayev addressed the nation on the Nurly Jol economic plan and an Anti-Corruption Program for 2015–2025 was adopted to which according to Baibek noted that the main indicator for the effectiveness of the program would be Kazakhstan's entry into the world's top 30 most developed economies.

On 11 March 2015, at the 16th Ordinary Congress held at the Palace of Independence, around 1,200 delegates took part in which for the first time more than 20% of them were heads of primary party organizations. At the congress, the participants discussed the issues in the results of works by the Political Council, Central Control, Audit Commission as well as the candidacy nomination for the 2015 presidential election. Nazarbayev for the last time became a presidential nominee for the Nur Otan and at the congress, put forward his proposed five institutional reforms in response to the economic challenges which were the formation of a modern, professional and autonomous state apparatus; ensuring the rule of law; industrialization and economic growth based on diversification; a nation of a common future; and a transparent and accountable state. Nazarbayev insisted that his proposals would strengthen the country and its entry into the top 30 developed countries of the world. In the presidential elections, Nazarbayev would go on to officially sweep 97.7% of the vote.

Following the announcement of the snap elections for Mazhilis, the 17th Nur Otan Extraordinary Congress took place on 29 January 2016 which Nazarbayev proclaimed it as a "historical moment", reflecting his 17-year chairmanship of the party where he claimed that it become a "basis for concrete achievements of our economy, state and society". At the congress, a party list and the Kazakhstan-2021: Unity. Stability. Creation electoral programme were approved in which Nazarbayev outlined its key areas of anti-crisis stabilization; structural modernization of the economy; new standards of quality of life for Kazakh citizens; constitutional patriotism; regional stability, integration and security. In the aftermath of 2016 legislative elections, the Nur Otan won an extra seat and 82.2% of the vote, a margin slightly more than compared to 2012 from which Nazarbayev called it "a great accomplishment of our democracy." Nazarbayev's daughter, Dariga, became an MP from the party list which fueled speculations in regard to potential political succession.

On 3 November 2017, an expanded meeting of the Political Council was held from where Nazarbayev noted the Nur Otan's role in the constitutional reforms, insisting that the party should "become not just a tribune for explaining the meaning of the reform, but also be its active guide at all levels". During the meeting, the party discussed its results from activities for the first 10 months of 2017 and made changes to its composition in the Bureau of the Political Council. National Security Committee chairman Karim Massimov was removed from the council membership, which according to the Nur Otan secretary Qanybek Jūmaşev, was due to the party's charter where it forbids persons to work in the law enforcement system and having a membership in the party simultaneously. Massimov was replaced by Presidential Administration head Adilbek Zhaksybekov who was supported unanimously.

Tokayev era (January–April 2022)

Political and economic reforms 
On 23 November 2021, the spokesperson of Kazakhstan’s first President Nursultan Nazarbayev, Aidos Ukibai, announced that the former President will hand over the powers of the Nur Otan party chair to current President Kassym-Jomart Tokayev.

On 28 January 2022, after the events of the political unrest that happened on 2nd January, Tokayev has dismissed Nazarbayev from the Chairman of Nur Otan role, taking over the control by himself.

On 1 March 2022, during an extraordinary meeting of Nur Otan, a motion to change the party's name to its new title, "Amanat," was raised. This motion received support and was approved by the president and chairman of the party, Kassym-Jomart Tokayev, stating that "[the] Party's rebranding is not just about renaming it and changing a signboard, we must also reform the work of the whole party."

Qoşanov era (2022–present)

Political and economic reforms 
Tokayev left the party on 26 April 2022. On the same day, Erlan Qoşanov was elected as the new chairman.

Organisation

International partnership 
Despite not being affiliated with any political international, the Nur Otan has signed and renewed numerous cooperation agreements with other political parties worldwide. In October 2011, one was signed in Astana between Nur Otan and the Ukrainian Party of Regions, and another in 2015 with United Russia.

Chairman

Electoral history

Mazhilis elections

Party leadership elections

See also 
Zhas Otan

Notes

References

External links
Official website (Kazakh, Russian, English)

Political parties in Kazakhstan
Political parties established in 1999
1999 establishments in Kazakhstan
Eurosceptic parties